St Mary le Wigford is a Grade I listed parish church in Lincoln, England.

History

The church dates from the 11th century, with 12th and 13th century additions. The dedication stone in the west tower is a re-used Roman tombstone with a later Anglo-Saxon inscription which translates to "Eirtig had me built and endowed to the glory of Christ and Saint Mary, XP".

The church was restored in 1872 by R. C. Clarke of Nottingham. The south aisle was added in 1877 by Leach of Cambridge. The tower was restored by Watkins and Son in 1908. Later additions and alterations were done in 1975.

The tower contains 4 bells with a tenor of 6-hundredweight, all of which date from the 17th century. Two were cast in 1616, with two trebles added in 1636. The bells were rehung in 1932 by John Taylor & Co of Loughborough, when they were retuned as 1-4 of 6.

Memorials

There is an alabaster chest tomb, 1618, possibly by Maximilian Colt to Sir Thomas Grantham which was originally in St Martin's Church, Lincoln, since demolished.

Organ

Details of the organ can be found on the National Pipe Organ Register.

Organists

Francis Marshall Ward 1857 - ???? (formerly organist of Priory Church of St Mary, Abergavenny)
William Thomas Freemantle
Dennis Townhill 1943 - 1947

See also: Churches in Lincoln
St Benedict's Church, Lincoln
St Peter at Gowts
St Martin's Church, Lincoln
St Peter at Arches Church, Lincoln

References

11th-century church buildings in England
Church of England church buildings in Lincolnshire
Grade I listed churches in Lincolnshire
Saint Mary le Wigford